Coniopteris is an extinct genus of Mesozoic fern leaves with a fossil range from the Early Jurassic to the Cenomanian stage of the Late Cretaceous. It was widespread over both hemispheres during the Jurassic and Early Cretaceous, with over 130 species having been described. While traditionally assumed to have been a member of Dicksoniaceae or a close relative of Thyrsopteris, a 2020 cladistic analysis found it to be a stem group of Polypodiales. Most species of Coniopteris probably had a herbaceous habit. The genus is technically a junior synonym of the little used Polystichites, but was conserved by the ICZN in 2013.

References 

†
Prehistoric plant genera
Early Triassic genus first appearances
Cenomanian genus extinctions
Fossil taxa described in 1835
Fossil taxa described in 1849